Ian Gallash (born 17 June 1937) is an Australian cricketer. He played eleven first-class matches for Western Australia between 1962/63 and 1963/64.

References

External links
 

1937 births
Living people
Australian cricketers
Western Australia cricketers
Cricketers from Perth, Western Australia